Glantane East is a megalithic complex situated  from Millstreet, County Cork, Ireland. It is set in the Keel River valley on the north-west upper slopes of Musherabeg mountain, in the townland of Glantane. The complex includes a wedge tomb, two stone circles and a pair of stone alignments.

One of the slabs from the larger stone circle has fallen.

See also
 List of megalithic monuments in Cork

References

External links
Megalithics - Glantane East
Irish Megaliths - Selected Monuments in County Cork

Archaeological sites in County Cork
Dolmens in Ireland
Megalithic monuments in Ireland
Stone circles in Ireland